Dublin County North was a parliamentary constituency represented in Dáil Éireann, the lower house of the Irish parliament or Oireachtas, from 1969 to 1981. The method of election was proportional representation by means of the single transferable vote (PR-STV).

History and boundaries
The constituency was created under the Electoral (Amendment) Act 1969 for the 1969 general election, electing 4 deputies (Teachtaí Dála, commonly known as TDs). Under the Electoral (Amendment) Act 1974, it was reduced to 3 seats from 1977 onwards. It was abolished by the Electoral (Amendment) Act 1980.

TDs

Elections

1977 general election

1973 general election

1969 general election

See also 
Dáil constituencies
Politics of the Republic of Ireland
Historic Dáil constituencies
Elections in the Republic of Ireland

Notes, citations and sources

Citations

External links 
Oireachtas Members Database
Dublin Historic Maps: Parliamentary & Dail Constituencies 1780–1969 (a work in progress)

Dáil constituencies in County Dublin (historic)
1969 establishments in Ireland
1981 disestablishments in Ireland
Constituencies established in 1969
Constituencies disestablished in 1981